Benjamin "BJ" Flores (born January 29, 1979) is an American former professional boxer and a current boxing trainer. He challenged once for the WBC cruiserweight world title in 2016, and twice for interim world titles at cruiserweight and heavyweight.

Personal life
Flores who is of Mexican descent, is the grandson of Ralph Flores, the pilot who crashed his small plane in the wilds of Canada's Yukon Territory.

Born into a boxing family, Flores began attending the gym at the age of four years while watching his father Frank Flores train his older brothers and assist Olympic coach Ken Adams train future champions Vince Phillips and Kennedy McKinney. Prior to graduating from Willard High School in Willard, Missouri, Flores was an all state selection in football and track & field. Flores was offered a full football scholarship to BYU.

Flores took two years off from BYU to serve a mission for the Church of Jesus Christ of Latter-day Saints in the Mexico Culiacan Mission.  For two years Flores lived in one of the poorest areas of Mexico and helped by assisting in building houses, roofs, and other labor work for those less fortunate.
 
While in Culiacán, Flores began training at the same gym where Julio César Chávez trained as a child. After watching Flores hand out numerous beatings in sparring sessions, the locals began calling him "Peligroso" meaning "dangerous".

On March 16, 2023 in Medellin, Colombia while at a traffic light, Flores was shot in the leg during an attempted robbery.

Amateur career
Flores had a stellar amateur career prior to turning professional. In 1997, he won the National Golden Gloves light heavyweight championship. In 2001 and 2002, He won the National Amateur heavyweight championship.

Professional career

Flores made his professional debut on May 3, 2003, in Las Vegas, Nevada against Dallas Lane. Flores put three lefts together early in round one to send Lane to the canvas. He beat the count but crumpled quickly from an overhand right that caused the referee to stop the bout.

After winning his next two fights, Flores fought Gabriel Taylor on October 3, 2003, in Houston, Texas. Flores wobbled Taylor several times to the point that the referee stopped the fight in round two. Flores found himself in trouble in his next fight against Semisi Bloomfield after Flores was dropped twice in round two. However, Flores managed to come back and fight him to a draw.

Flores fought Christopher Hairston on January 24, 2004, at the Boardwalk Hall in Atlantic City, New Jersey. Flores had Hairston on the canvas twice before Hairston refused to continue. Two months later, Flores defeated Eric French by unanimous decision. On May 8, 2004, Flores knocked out Brian Maclin with a left hook.

After winning his next eight fights, Flores fought Ali Supreme on May 13, 2006, at the Arizona Veterans Memorial Coliseum in Phoenix, Arizona. Flores went on the offensive and knocked Supreme to the canvas with a vicious flurry late in the first round. Ali tried to stand but buckled, and the referee stopped the fight.

After defeating Gary Dydell, Flores fought Chris Thomas on January 19, 2007. Flores won by unanimous decision. Flores won his next two fights against Patrick Nwamu and Andy Sample.

Flores fought Darnell Wilson for the United States Boxing Association cruiserweight title on February 8, 2008, in Dover, Delaware. Flores used ring movement to avoid the aggression of Wilson on the way to a unanimous decision victory.

IBO Cruiserweight Championship
Flores lost to IBO Cruiserweight Champion Danny Green in November 2010 and by unanimous decision, the first loss of his career.

Fight against Beibut Shumenov
On July 25, 2015 Flores took on Kazakhstan’s Beibut Shumenov in a Premier Boxing Champions fight night at the Palms Casino Resort, Las Vegas. The fight was broadcast live on NBCSN. Flores pressed the action throughout, serving as the aggressor much of the night. Shumenov began ramping up his offense more in Round 8, throwing combinations and taking advantage of a tiring Flores. Flores crushed Shumenov with a hard right in Round 12 but it was too late in the fight for him to capitalize further, resulting in unanimous decision win for Shumenov and the capture of the interim WBA World cruiserweight title.

On 15 October, 2016, BJ Flores challenged Tony Bellew for the WBC cruiserweight title, in Bellew's hometown of Liverpool. Flores started the fight off well, but then got dropped three times in the second round. Finally, in the third round, the defending champion dropped Flores a fourth time for the final count.

On 11 August, 2018, Flores fought Trevor Bryan for the vacant interim WBA heavyweight title. Bryan dropped Flores six times, and closed the fight in four rounds.

Career as commentator
As Flores continued to climb the ranks in the 200-pound division, Flores began pulling double duty by 2012, working as a ringside analyst, and he is now part of the Premier Boxing Champions on NBC broadcast team.  In 2016, he served as part of NBC's team covering boxing at the Rio Olympics.

Career as boxing trainer
As of 2021, Flores has worked as a full time boxing trainer for professional boxer and social media personality Jake Paul.

Professional boxing record

References

External links
 
 ESB Exclusive Interview: B.J. Flores, Changing Perceptions by Troy Ondrizek, 31 May 2006, East Side Boxing
 Official website of B.J. Flores
 BJ Flores - Profile, News Archive & Current Rankings at Box.Live

American boxers of Mexican descent
American Mormon missionaries in Mexico
1979 births
Living people
20th-century Mormon missionaries
BYU Cougars football players
Cruiserweight boxers
National Golden Gloves champions
Boxers from San Francisco
Winners of the United States Championship for amateur boxers
Latter Day Saints from California
American male boxers